Maame is a 2023 literary fiction novel written by Jessica George. George's debut novel, was published in 2023 by St. Martin's Press.

The novel was named the February 2023 book club pick on The Today Show.

Plot
Maddie, a young woman in London, struggles to balance her life as caretaker of her critically ill father, her mother's verbal tirades and a challenging career.  When her mother returns from a trip to Ghana, Maddie moves out on her own for the first time.

References

2023 novels
Bildungsromans
Debut novels
English-language novels